Alief Taylor High School is a public high school in the Alief Independent School District. It is located in an unincorporated area in the Alief community of Harris County, near Houston. Opened in 2001, Alief Taylor is the newest high school in the district. It is named after Edward "Doc" Taylor, who taught AP American History at Alief Hastings High School.

According to the Texas Education Agency, Taylor covers grades 9-12 and has 500 or more students in each grade level. When it opened in the fall of 2001, it had only freshmen and sophomores. During the 2002–2003 school year the 11th grade was added. Taylor added its first 12th grade class during the 2003–2004 school year. Alief Taylor is one of two schools in Alief ISD that does not include a Ninth Grade Center, a separate building for ninth grade students. The other is Kerr High School. Alief Taylor was originally referred to as "High School No. 4."

It is located in the International District.

In 2019, Taylor received a C grade from the Texas Education Agency.

History

Alief Taylor High School opened on August 13, 2001. The school was initially designated for freshmen and sophomores only, in an attempt to alleviate overcrowding at nearby Elsik and Hastings High Schools which, at the time, had a combined student population of over 9,000. It eventually expanded to accept students from 9th to 12th grades. Unlike Hastings or Elsik, Taylor hosts all grade levels (9-12) on the same campus.

Academics
In 2010, Taylor achieved the highest AP scores in the district, reporting that 77% of their students received a score of three or higher. Taylor's graduation rate was the highest in the district, and its dropout rate was the lowest of comparable district high schools.

In the 2016–2017 school year, Taylor High School received a Met Standard rating from the Texas Education Agency. The class of 2015 averaged a score of 18 on the ACT and 1148 on the SAT.

For the 2018–2019 school year, the school received a C grade from the Texas Education Agency, with an overall score of 78 out of 100. The school received a C grade in two domains, Student Achievement (score of 73) and Closing the Gaps (score of 72), and a B grade in School Progress (score of 80). The school did not receive any of the seven possible distinction designations.

Athletics

Alief Taylor has one state championship, six regional titles, and eight district titles in football, track, cross country, tennis, swimming, and diving.

Extracurricular activities

Alief Taylor hosts many clubs and organizations for its students, including band, choir, orchestra, drumline, colorguard, dance, theater, student council, speech and debate, math club, academic decathlon, and support groups for male, female, and LGBTQ+ students.

In 2004, the marching band appeared in the film Friday Night Lights, in which they assume the role as the Dallas Carter band in the film.

The Alief Taylor Drumline are the gold medalist recipients of the 2006-07 PSAA TCGC Championship, a state-level competition.

Demographics
In the 2018–2019 school year, there were 3,112 students. 32.8% were African American, 12.2% were Asian, 52.8% were Hispanic, 0.4% were American Indian, 0.1% were Pacific Islander, 1.5% were White, and 0.4% were two or more races. 73.9% of students were economically disadvantaged, 21.1% were English language learners, and 8.6% received special education services.

Feeder patterns
All Alief ISD elementary, intermediate, and middle schools feed into Taylor, as high school placement in Alief ISD is determined by a lottery, which may result in Elsik, Hastings, or Taylor. If a student is selected by lottery to attend a high school different from the high school which a relative currently attends or graduated from, the student may opt to transfer to that school. Students may also complete an application for the district's magnet high school, Kerr, or the recently established Alief Early College High School.

Neighborhoods served by AISD include Alief, most of Westchase, Bellaire West, most of the New Chinatown, most of Leawood, Mission Leona, and Mission Bend.

Notable alumni
Martellus Bennett - NFL player and Storyteller, Super Bowl Champion
Michael Bennett - NFL player, Super Bowl Champion
Duke Ejiofor - NFL player
Joshua Kalu - NFL player
Ogbonnia Okoronkwo - NFL player, Super Bowl Champion 
Fendi Onobun - NFL player
Cheta Ozougwu - NFL player
Givens Price - NFL player
Michael Tauiliili - German Football League player

References

External links

 
 Alief Taylor Math Club

Alief Independent School District high schools
Public education in Houston
Educational institutions established in 2001
2001 establishments in Texas